Syriac is a dialect of Aramaic. Portions of the Old Testament were written in Aramaic and there are Aramaic phrases in the New Testament. Syriac translations of the New Testament were among the first and date from the 2nd century. The whole Bible was translated by the 5th century. Besides Syriac, there are Bible translations into other Aramaic dialects.

Syria played an important or even predominant role in the beginning of Christianity. Here is where the Gospel of Matthew, the Gospel of Luke, the Didache, Ignatiana, and the Gospel of Thomas are believed to have been written. Syria was the country in which the Greek language intersected with the Syriac, which was closely related to the Aramaic dialect used by Jesus and the Apostles. That is why Syriac versions are highly esteemed by textual critics.

Scholars have distinguished five or six different Syriac versions of all or part of the New Testament. It is possible that some translations have been lost. The manuscripts originate in countries like Lebanon, Egypt (Sinai), Mesopotamia, Assyria, Armenia, Georgia, India, and even from China. This is good evidence for the great historical activity of the Syriac Church of the East.

Diatessaron 

This is the earliest translation of the gospels into Syriac. The earliest translation of any New Testament text from Greek seems to have been the Diatessaron, a harmony of the four canonical gospels (perhaps with a now lost fifth text) prepared about AD 170 by Tatian in Rome. Although no original text of the Diatessaron survives, its foremost witness is a prose commentary on it by Ephrem the Syrian. Although there are many so-called manuscript witnesses to the Diatessaron, they all differ, and, ultimately only witness to the enduring popularity of such harmonies. Rescensions appeared in later centuries as translation of originals. Many medieval European harmonies draw on the Codex Fuldensis.

Old Syriac version
The Old Syriac version translation of the four gospels or Vetus Syra is preserved today in only four manuscripts, both with a large number of gaps.
The Curetonian Gospels consist of fragments of the four Gospels. The text was brought in 1842 from the Nitrian Desert in Egypt, and is now held in the British Library. These fragments were examined by William Cureton and edited by him in 1858. The manuscript is dated paleographically to the 5th century. It is called Curetonian Syriac, and is designated by Syrc.

The second manuscript is a palimpsest discovered by Agnes Smith Lewis at Saint Catherine's Monastery in 1892 at Mount Sinai called the Syriac Sinaiticus, and designated by Syrs. This version was known and cited by Ephrem the Syrian, It is a representative of the Western text-type. Two additional manuscripts of the Old Syriac version of the gospels were published in 2016 by Sebastian Brock and in 2023 by Grigory Kessel, respectively.

These four manuscripts represent only the Gospels. The text of Acts and the Pauline Epistles has not survived to the present. It is known only from citations made by Eastern fathers. The text of Acts was reconstructed by Frederick Cornwallis Conybeare, and the text of the Pauline Epistles by J. Molitor. They used Ephrem's commentaries.

Peshitta

The term Peshitta was used by Moses bar Kepha in 903 and means "simple" (in analogy to the Latin Vulgate). It is the oldest Syriac version which has survived to the present day in its entirety. 
It contains the entire Old Testament, most (?) of the deuterocanonical books, as well as 22 books of the New Testament, lacking the shorter Catholic Epistles (2-3 John, 2 Peter, Jude, as well as John 7:53-8:11). 
It was made in the beginning of the 5th century. Its authorship was ascribed to Rabbula, bishop of Edessa (411-435). The Syriac church still uses it to the present day.

More than 350 manuscripts survived, several of which date from the 5th and 6th centuries.
In the Gospels it is closer to the Byzantine text-type, but in Acts to the Western text-type. It is designated by Syrp.

The earliest manuscript of the Peshitta is a Pentateuch dated AD 464. There are two New Testament manuscripts of the 5th century (Codex Phillipps 1388).

 Some manuscripts
 British Library, Add. 14479 — the earliest dated Peshitta Apostolos.
 British Library, Add. 14459 — the oldest dated Syriac manuscript of the two Gospels
 British Library, Add. 14470 — the whole Peshitta text from the fifth/sixth century
 British Library, Add. 14448 — the major part of Peshitta from the 699/700

Syro-Hexaplar version
The Syro-Hexaplar version is the Syriac translation of the Septuagint based on the fifth column of Origen's Hexapla. The translation was made by Bishop Paul of Tella, around 617, from the Hexaplaric text of the Septuagint.

Later Syriac versions
The Philoxenian was probably produced in 508 for Philoxenus, Bishop of Mabbug in eastern Syria. This translation contains the five books not found in the Peshitta: 2 Peter, 2 John, 3 John, Jude, and the Apocalypse. This translation survived only in short fragments. It is designated by syrph. Harclensis is designated by syrh. It is represented by some 35 manuscripts dating from the 7th century and later; they show kinship with the Western text-type.

According to some scholars the Philoxenian and Harclensis are only recensions of Peshitta, but according to others they are independent new translations.

See also 
 List of the Syriac New Testament manuscripts
Other early Eastern translations
Coptic versions of the Bible
Bible translations into Sogdian
Bible translations into Nubian
Bible translations into Persian

References

Bibliography 

 
 
 
 
 
 W. Wright, Catalogue of the Syriac Manuscripts in the British Museum, Gorgias Press LLC 2002.
 

 Syriac Versions of the Bible at the Bible Research
 At the Encyclopedia of Textual Criticism
 The New Testament with full western vocalization at syriacbible.nl
 Peshitta with analytical lexicon and English translation

Early versions of the Bible
Texts in Syriac
Bible translations into Aramaic